The Box Set Series is a 2014 compilation series from Legacy Recordings, including:

 The Box Set Series by John Denver
 The Box Set Series by Hall & Oates
 The Box Set Series by Sarah McLachlan
 The Box Set Series by Barry Manilow
 The Box Set Series by Willie Nelson
 The Box Set Series by REO Speedwagon